Camponotus flavomarginatus is a black coloured ant with coarse erect hairs on the abdomen. It is fairly common especially on isolated ground where it nests in the soil. It forages widely across the ground and on native herbaceous vegetation. It is found in Africa, particularly in Cameroon.

References

External links 

flavomarginatus
Hymenoptera of Africa
Insects described in 1862
Taxa named by Gustav Mayr